Jordy Kuiper (born 2 June 1995) is a Dutch basketball player who plays for Real Valladolid. He played five seasons of college basketball for UNCG.

Early career
Kuiper played with the Canarias Basketball Academy in Spain. There, he averaged 16 points and 9 rebounds per game.

College career
Kuiper played college basketball for the UNC Greensboro Spartans. In his third year, he redshirted. As a student at UNCG, Kuiper majored in sociology.

Professional career
In August 2018, Kuiper signed his first professional contract with Grindavík in Iceland. He averaged 16.8 points and 7.8 rebounds per game in the Icelandic Premier League.

On 7 August 2019, Kuiper signed with Cáceres Ciudad del Baloncesto for the 2019–20 season.

On 14 July 2020, Kuiper signed with CEP Lorient in France. He averaged 7.2 points in 13 games in the NM1.

On August 2, 2021, he has signed with Real Valladolid Baloncesto of the LEB Oro.

National team career 
On 12 November 2022, Kuipers made his senior debut for the Netherlands senior team in a 77–96 home loss to Ukraine. He scored 2 points in nine minutes of play.

References

External links
Icelandic statistics at Icelandic Basketball Association

1995 births
Living people
Cáceres Ciudad del Baloncesto players
CB Valladolid players
CEP Lorient players
Dutch expatriate basketball people in France
Dutch expatriate basketball people in Iceland
Dutch expatriate basketball people in Spain
Dutch expatriate basketball people in the United States
Dutch men's basketball players
Grindavík men's basketball players
Power forwards (basketball)
Sportspeople from Groningen (city)
UNC Greensboro Spartans men's basketball players
Úrvalsdeild karla (basketball) players